The Best So Far… is a CD/DVD compilation album by neo soul musician D'Angelo, released June 24, 2008 on Virgin Records. The compilation features songs from his two previous studio albums, Brown Sugar and Voodoo, as well as rarities and a second disc, a DVD of previously unreleased videos. Around the same time, the compilation was released digitally without the Erykah Badu and Raphael Saddiq featured songs, under the title Ultimate D'Angelo.

Track listing

CD

DVD
Lady (Video)
Brown Sugar (Video)
Cruisin' (Video)
Me And Those Dreamin' Eyes (Video)
Left & Right (Video)
Untitled (How Does It Feel) (Video)
Send It On (Video)

Personnel 

 Evren Göknar - Mastering Engineer

References

2008 greatest hits albums
D'Angelo albums
2008 video albums
Music video compilation albums